Sparven om julmorgonen (Swedish, Sparrow on Christmas Morning) is a poem by Zachris Topelius from 1859. It has been translated to Finnish by Konrad Alexis Hougberg. You can see the sorrow of Topelius in the poem; his son, Rafael, died at the age of one the spring before he wrote the
poem.

The poem has been composed to a song several times. The most known of them must be the Christmas carol by Otto Kotilainen. It was published for the first time in the "Joulupukki" magazine in
1913.

The song has been recorded by numerous popular Finnish artists, such as Mauno Kuusisto, Sulo Saarits, Tapani Kansa, Hector, Marco Hietala, Vesa-Matti Loiri, Viikate & Timo Rautiainen, Pepe Willberg, Tarja Turunen, Matti ja Teppo, Petri Laaksonen, Richard Järnefelt, Rajaton, Suvi Teräsniska, Diandra, Club for Five and Jarkko Ahola.

Lyrics

See also

List of Christmas Carols#Finland
Sylvian Joululaulu
Joulupuu on rakennettu
En etsi valtaa, loistoa

References

 
Finnish poems